Carlo Schmid is a Swiss pilot.

In 2012 he became the youngest solo pilot to fly around the world at the age of 22, breaking the previous record held by Barrington Irving. The 110-hour flight of his Cessna 210 lasted 80 days from July 11 to September 29, 2012. The flight concluded with a landing at Dübendorf Air Base, accompanied by the PC-7 Team of the Swiss Air Force.

In 2014, Schmid's record was broken by 19-year-old Matt Guthmiller and in 2022 by 17-year old British-Belgian pilot Mack Rutherford.

Notes

References

External links
 Official Website
 Swissinfo.ch
 Frankfurter Allgemeine Zeitung
 Neue Zürcher Zeitung
 SCCIJ.jp

Swiss aviators
Living people
Swiss aviation record holders
Year of birth missing (living people)